The Sellaronda is the ski circuit around the Sella group in Northern Italy.

The Sella massif lies between the four Ladin valleys of Badia, Gherdëina, Fascia, and Fodom and is divided between the provinces of South Tyrol, Trentino and Belluno. It can be driven around by car crossing the Campolongo Pass, Pordoi Pass, Sella Pass, and Gardena Pass. In winter it is possible to ski around the entire massif by using the Sellaronda ski lift carousel. Also each winter the alpine touring ski Sellaronda Skimarathon race is held, which leads  around the entire Sella and covers 42 km of mountain trails. Skiers are advised to set off before 10am to make sure they complete the circuit before the lifts close, as it can take up to six hours to complete depending on the weather and your ability. The Sella Ronda also gives access to a further 500+km of connected skiing with neighbouring resorts. The same trails can be mastered by Mountain bike during the summer.

References

http://www.sellaronda.info/
Detailed description of the Sella Ronda
http://www.alpineanswers.co.uk/skiing-the-Sella-Ronda

Ski areas and resorts in Italy